Indigofera is a large genus of over 750 species of flowering plants belonging to the pea family Fabaceae. They are widely distributed throughout the tropical and subtropical regions of the world.

Description
Species of Indigofera are mostly shrubs, though some are small trees or herbaceous perennials or annuals. Most have pinnate leaves. Racemes of flowers grow in the leaf axils, in hues of red, but there are a few white- and yellow-flowered species. The fruit is a legume pod of varying size and shape.

Indigofera is a varied genus that has shown unique characteristics making it an interesting candidate as a potential perennial crop. Specifically, there is diverse variation among species with a number of unique characteristics. Some examples of this diversity include differences in pericarp thickness, fruit type, and flowering morphology. The unique characteristics it has displayed include potential for mixed smallholder systems with at least one other species and a resilience that allows for constant nitrogen uptake despite varying conditions.

One example of its unique flowering morphology is an open carpel not often seen elsewhere. In addition, it appears that the organ primordial is often formed at deeper layers than other eudicots. This variety could have significant implications on its role in an actual perennial polyculture. For example, different flowering morphologies could be artificially selected for in varying directions in order to better fit in different environmental conditions and with different populations of other plants.

The types of fruit produced by different species of Indigofera can also be divided into broad categories that again show great variation. The three basic types of fruit categories can be separated by their curvature including straight, slightly curved, and falcate (sickle-shaped). In addition, several of the species including Indigofera microcarpa, Indigofera suffruticosa, and Indigofera enneaphylla have shown delayed dehiscence (maturing) of fruits This variation could again allow for artificial selection of the most abundant and nutritious fruit types and shapes.

Another way to categorize Indigofera is by its pericarp thickness. The pericarp (the tissue from the ovary that surrounds the seeds) can be categorized as type I, type II, and type III with type I having the thinnest pericarp and fewest layers of schlerenchymatous (stiff) tissue and type III having the thickest pericarp and most schlerenchymatous layers. Despite the previous examples of delayed dehiscence, most fruits of this genus show normal explosive dehiscence to disperse seeds. Similar to fruit shape, the variation in fruit sizes allows for the thickest and most bountiful fruits to be selected.

Uses

Indigo dye
Several species, especially Indigofera tinctoria and Indigofera suffruticosa, are used to produce the dye indigo. Scraps of Indigo-dyed fabric likely dyed with plants from the genus Indigofera discovered at Huaca Prieta predate Egyptian indigo-dyed fabrics by more than 1,500 years. Colonial planters in the Caribbean grew indigo and transplanted its cultivation when they settled in the colony of South Carolina and North Carolina where people of the Tuscarora confederacy adopted the dyeing process for head wraps and clothing.  Exports of the crop did not expand until the mid-to late 18th century. When Eliza Lucas Pinckney and enslaved Africans successfully cultivated new strains near Charleston it became the second most important cash crop in the colony (after rice) before the American Revolution. It comprised more than one-third of all exports in value.

The chemical aniline, from which many important dyes are derived, was first synthesized from Indigofera suffruticosa (syn. Indigofera anil, whence the name aniline).

In Indonesia, the Sundanese use Indigofera tinctoria (known locally as tarum or nila) as dye for batik. Marco Polo was the first to report on the preparation of indigo in India. Indigo was quite often used in European easel painting during the Middle Ages.

Species
Indigofera comprises the following species:

Palaeotropical clade

 Indigofera argentea Burm.f.
 Indigofera atriceps Hook.f.

 subsp. atriceps Hook.f.
 subsp. glandulosissima (R.E.Fr.) J.B.Gillett
 subsp. kaessneri (Baker f.) J.B.Gillett
 subsp. ramosa (Cronquist) J.B.Gillett
 subsp. rhodesiaca J.B.Gillett
 subsp. setosissima (Harms) J.B.Gillett
 subsp. ufipaensis J.B.Gillett
 Indigofera bainesii Baker
 Indigofera basiflora J.B.Gillett
 Indigofera biglandulosa J.B.Gillett
 Indigofera bracteolata DC.
 Indigofera brevicalyx Baker f.
 Indigofera brevipatentes 
 Indigofera colutea (Burm.f.) Merr.—rusty indigo, sticky indigo
 Indigofera compressa Lam.
 Indigofera congesta Baker
 Indigofera demissa Taub.
 Indigofera eremophila Thulin
 Indigofera erythrogramma Baker

 Indigofera gairdnerae Baker f.
 Indigofera glabra L.
 Indigofera grata E.Mey.
 Indigofera hermannioides J.B.Gillett
 Indigofera heterotricha DC.
 Indigofera heudelotii Baker
 Indigofera hilaris Eckl. & Zeyh.
 var. hilaris Eckl. & Zeyh.
 var. microscypha (Baker) J.B. Gillett	
 Indigofera inhambanensis Klotzsch
 Indigofera kirkii Oliv.

 Indigofera leucotricha E.Pritzel
 Indigofera macrocalyx Guill. & Perr.
 Indigofera microcalyx Baker
 Indigofera mildbraediana J.B.Gillett
 Indigofera mimosoides Baker
 Indigofera monantha Baker f.
 Indigofera mooneyi Thulin
 Indigofera montoya Spanish Indigo
 Indigofera mysorensis DC.
 Indigofera nebrowniana J.B.Gillett
 Indigofera nigritana Hook.f.
 Indigofera nyassica Gilli
 Indigofera omissa J.B.Gillett
 Indigofera paniculata Pers.
 subsp. gazensis (Baker f.) J.B.Gillett
 subsp. paniculata Pers.
 Indigofera phymatodea Thulin
 Indigofera podophylla Harv.
 Indigofera poliotes Eckl. & Zeyh.

 Indigofera pulchra Willd.
 Indigofera quarrei Cronquist

 Indigofera rothii Baker
 Indigofera rubroglandulosa Germish.

 Indigofera simplicifolia Lam.
 Indigofera strobilifera (Hochst.) Baker
 subsp. lanuginosa (Baker f.) J.B.Gillett
 subsp. strobilifera (Hochst.) Baker
 Indigofera suaveolens Jaub. & Spach
 Indigofera tanganyikensis Baker f.
 Indigofera tetrasperma Pers.
 Indigofera trachyphylla Oliv.
 Indigofera uniflora Roxb.

 Indigofera vohemarensis Baill.
 Indigofera wightii Wight & Arn.
 Indigofera wituensis Baker f.

Pantropical clade

 Indigofera amblyantha Craib
 Indigofera amorphoides Jaub. & Spach

 Indigofera arrecta A.Rich.—Natal indigo, Bengal indigo, Java indigo
 Indigofera articulata Gouan
 Indigofera astragalina DC.
 Indigofera atropurpurea Hornem.
 Indigofera australis Willd.—Australian indigo
 Indigofera baumiana Harms
 Indigofera binderi Kotschy
 Indigofera blanchetiana Benth.
 Indigofera bojeri Baker
 Indigofera boranica Thulin
 Indigofera bosseri Du Puy & Labat
 Indigofera boviperda Morrison
 Indigofera byobiensis Hosok.
 Indigofera caloneura Kurz
 Indigofera caroliniana Mill.—Carolina indigo
 Indigofera cassioides DC.

 Indigofera cavallii Chiov.
 Indigofera coerulea Roxb.
 var. coerulea Roxb.
 var. monosperma (Santapau) Santapau
 var. occidentalis J.B.Gillett & Ali
 Indigofera conzattii Rose
 Indigofera cuernavacana Rose
 Indigofera cylindracea Baker
 Indigofera decora Lindl.—Chinese indigo
 var. chalara (Craib) Y.Y.Fang & C.Z.Zheng
 var. cooperi (Craib) Y.Y.Fang & C.Z.Zheng
 var. decora Lindl.
 var. ichangensis (Craib) Y.Y.Fang & C.Z.Zheng
 Indigofera deightonii J.B.Gillett
 subsp. deightonii J.B.Gillett
 subsp. rhodesica J.B.Gillett
 Indigofera dendroides Jacq.

 Indigofera dosua D.Don
 var. dosua D.Don
 var. simlensis (Ali) Sanjappa
 Indigofera emarginella A.Rich.
 Indigofera frondosa N.E.Br.
 Indigofera frutescens L.f.
 Indigofera fulgens Baker
 subsp. brachybotrys (Baker) J.B.Gillett
 subsp. fulgens Baker
 Indigofera galegoides DC.
 Indigofera georgei E.Pritz.

 Indigofera grandiflora B.H.Choi & S.K.Cho
 Indigofera haplophylla F.Muell.
 Indigofera hebepetala Baker
 var. glabra Ali
 var. hebepetala Baker
 Indigofera hedyantha Eckl. & Zeyh.
 Indigofera heterantha Brandis—Himalayan indigo
 Indigofera himalayensis Ali
 Indigofera hirsuta L.—hairy indigo, rough hairy indigo
 Indigofera homblei Baker f. & Martin

 Indigofera ixocarpa Peter G.Wilson & Rowe
 Indigofera jucunda Schrire
 Indigofera karnatakana Sanjappa
 Indigofera kirilowii Maxim ex Palib.—Kirilow's indigo
 Indigofera koreana Ohwi—Korean indigo
 Indigofera lacei Craib
 Indigofera langebergensis L.Bolus
 Indigofera laxiracemosa Baker f.
 Indigofera leprieurii Baker f.

 Indigofera longiracemosa Baill.
 Indigofera lyallii Baker
 subsp. lyallii Baker
 subsp. nyassica J.B.Gillett
 Indigofera longibarbata Engl.
 Indigofera longimucronata Baker f.
 Indigofera macrophylla Schum. & Thonn.

 Indigofera mangokyensis "R.Vig., p.p.A"

 Indigofera melanadenia Harv.
 Indigofera natalensis Bolus
 Indigofera nigrescens King & Prain
 Indigofera pendula Franch.
 var. pendula Franch.
 var. umbrosa (Craib) Y.Y.Fang & C.Z.Zheng

 Indigofera platycarpa Rose
 Indigofera podocarpa Baker f. & Martin
 Indigofera pratensis F.Muell.

 Indigofera rhynchocarpa Baker
 var. latipinna (Johnson) J.B.Gillett
 var. rhynchocarpa Baker
 var. uluguruensis J.B.Gillett

 Indigofera roseocaerulea Baker f.

 Indigofera rugosa Benth.
 Indigofera sanguinea N.E.Br.
 Indigofera schlechteri Baker f.
 Indigofera sedgewickiana Vatke
 Indigofera setiflora Baker
 Indigofera sokotrana Vierh.
 Indigofera sootepensis Craib
 Indigofera stenophylla Guill. & Perr.
 Indigofera subcorymbosa Baker
 Indigofera suffruticosa Mill.—anil indigo, anil de pasto

 Indigofera sutherlandoides Baker
 Indigofera swaziensis Bolus
 subsp. perplexa (N.E.Br.) J.B.Gillett
 subsp. swaziensis Bolus

 Indigofera thibaudiana DC.
 Indigofera tinctoria L.—indigo, true indigo, dye indigo
 subsp. arcuata (J.B.Gillett) Schrire
 subsp. tinctoria L.
 Indigofera tristis E.Mey.
 Indigofera truxillensis Kunth
 Indigofera varia E.Mey.
 Indigofera venulosa Benth.
 Indigofera verrucosa Eckl. & Zeyh.
 Indigofera verruculosa Peter G.Wilson
 Indigofera vicioides Jaub. & Spach
 var. rogersii R.E.Fr.
 var. vicioides Jaub. & Spach
 Indigofera zeyheri Eckl. & Zeyh.
 Indigofera zollingeriana Miq.—Zollinger's indigo

Cape clade

 Indigofera alopecuroides (Burm.f.) DC.
 Indigofera alpina Eckl. & Zeyh.
 Indigofera amoena Aiton
 Indigofera angustata E.Mey.
 Indigofera angustifolia L.
 var. angustifolia L.
 var. tenuifolia (Lam.) Harv.

 Indigofera brachystachya (DC.) E.Mey.
 Indigofera burchellii DC.
 Indigofera candolleana Meissner
 Indigofera capillaris Thunb.

 Indigofera concava Harv.
 Indigofera cuneifolia Eckl. & Zeyh.
 Indigofera cytisoides Thunb.
 Indigofera declinata E.Mey.
 Indigofera denudata Thunb.
 Indigofera digitata Thunb.
 Indigofera dimidiata Walp.
 Indigofera filicaulis Eckl. & Zeyh.
 Indigofera filifolia Thunb.
 Indigofera flabellata Harv.
 Indigofera gifbergensis C.H.Stirt. & Jarvie
 Indigofera glomerata E.Mey.
 Indigofera heterophylla Thunb.
 Indigofera hispida Eckl. & Zeyh.
 Indigofera ionii Jarvie & C.H.Stirt.
 Indigofera mauritanica (L.) Thunb.
 Indigofera merxmuelleri A.Schreib.
 Indigofera meyeriana Eckl. & Zeyh.
 Indigofera mollis Eckl. & Zeyh.
 Indigofera nigromontana Eckl. & Zeyh.
 Indigofera nudicaulis E.Mey.
 Indigofera ovata Thunb.
 Indigofera porrecta Eckl. & Zeyh.
 Indigofera psoraloides (L.) L.
 Indigofera sarmentosa L.f.

 Indigofera sulcata DC.
 Indigofera superba C.H.Stirt.

Tethyan clade

 Indigofera achyranthoides Taub.
 Indigofera alternans DC.
 Indigofera ammoxylum (DC.) Polhill
 Indigofera anabibensis A.Schreib.
 Indigofera angulosa Edgew.
 Indigofera antunesiana Harms
 Indigofera arabica Jaub. & Spach
 Indigofera aspera DC.
 Indigofera asperifolia Benth.
 var. asperifolia Benth.
 var. lanceolata Chodat & Hassler
 var. macrophylla Chodat & Hassler
 Indigofera auricoma E.Mey.

 Indigofera bemarahaensis Du Puy & Labat
 Indigofera bongardiana (Kuntze) Burkart
 Indigofera bongensis Kotschy & Peyr.
 Indigofera cerighellii M.Pelt.
 Indigofera cloiselii Drake
 Indigofera conjugata Baker
 var. conjugata Baker
 var. schweinfurthii (Taub.) J.B. Gillett
 var. trimorphophylla (Taub.) J.B. Gillett
 Indigofera cordifolia Roth
 Indigofera daleoides Harv.
 Indigofera dalzellii T.Cooke
 Indigofera depauperata Drake
 Indigofera depressa Harv.
 Indigofera dionaeifolia (S. Moore) Schrire
 Indigofera diphylla Vent.
 Indigofera disticha Eckl. & Zeyh.
 Indigofera diversifolia DC.
 Indigofera drepanocarpa Taub.

 Indigofera ewartiana Domin
 Indigofera exellii Torre
 Indigofera fanshawei J.B.Gillett
 Indigofera glandulosa Wendl.
 var. glandulosa Wendl.
 var. sykesii Baker
 Indigofera glaucescens Eckl. & Zeyh.
 Indigofera guaranitica Hassl.
 Indigofera gypsacea Thulin
 Indigofera hartwegii Rydb.
 Indigofera hiranensis Thulin
 Indigofera hochstetteri Baker
 subsp. hochstetteri Baker
 subsp. streyana (Merxm.) A.Schreib.
 Indigofera hololeuca Harv.
 Indigofera humbertiana M.Pelt.
 Indigofera interrupta (Du Puy, Labat & Schrire) Schrire
 Indigofera jamaicensis Spreng.
 Indigofera kelleri Baker f.
 Indigofera leptocarpa Eckl. & Zeyh.
 Indigofera leptosepala Nutt.
 Indigofera lespedezioides Kunth
 var. acutifolia Hassler
 var. lespedezioides Kunth
 Indigofera leucoclada Baker
 Indigofera linifolia (L.f.) Retz.
 Indigofera linnaei Ali
 Indigofera longidentata (Du Puy, Labat & Schrire) Schrire
 Indigofera lupatana Baker f.
 Indigofera mahafalensis (Du Puy, Labat & Schrire) Schrire
 Indigofera marmorata Balf.f.
 Indigofera microcarpa Desv.
 Indigofera miniata Ortega—coastal indigo, scarlet-pea

 Indigofera nephrocarpa Balf.f.
 Indigofera nephrocarpoides J.B.Gillett
 Indigofera nummularia Baker
 Indigofera obcordata Eckl. & Zeyh.
 Indigofera oblongifolia Forssk.

 Indigofera praticola Baker f.
 Indigofera pseudocompressa (Du Puy, Labat & Schrire) Schrire
 Indigofera pungens E.Mey.

 Indigofera schimperi Jaub. & Spach
 Indigofera semitrijuga Forssk.
 Indigofera sessiliflora DC.
 Indigofera spicata Forssk.
 Indigofera spiniflora Boiss.
 Indigofera spinosa Forssk.
 Indigofera squalida Prain
 Indigofera subulata Vahl ex Poir.
 Indigofera tephrosioides Kunth

 Indigofera thomsonii Baker f.
 Indigofera torulosa E.Mey.
 var. angustiloba (Baker f.) J.B.Gillett
 var. torulosa E.Mey.
 Indigofera trifoliata L.—threeleaf indigo
 var. duthiei (Naik) Sanjappa
 var. trifoliata L.
 var. unifoliolata (Merr.) De Kort & G.Thijsse
 Indigofera trigonelloides Jaub. & Spach
 Indigofera trita L.f.—Asian indigo
 var. maffei (Chiov.) Ali
 var. marginulata (Wight & Arn.) Sanjappa
 var. scabra (Roth) De Kort & G.Thijsse
 var. trita L.f.
 Indigofera volkensii Taub.

Unassigned

 Indigofera acanthinocarpa Blatt.

 Indigofera acanthoclada Dinter
 Indigofera accepta N.E.Br.
 Indigofera acutiflora N.E.Br.
 Indigofera acutipetala Y.Y.Fang & C.Z.Zheng
 Indigofera adenocarpa E.Mey.
 Indigofera adenoides Baker f.
 Indigofera adesmiifolia A.Gray
 Indigofera ambelacensis Schweinf.
 Indigofera amitina N.E.Br.
 Indigofera ammobia Maconochie

 Indigofera ancistrocarpa Thulin
 Indigofera andrewsiana J.B.Gillett
 Indigofera andringitrensis R.Vig.
 Indigofera ankaratrensis R.Vig.

 Indigofera aquae-nitentis Bremek.
 Indigofera aralensis Gagnep.
 Indigofera arenophila Schinz
 Indigofera argutidens Craib

 Indigofera aristata Spreng.
 Indigofera arnottii (Kuntze) Peter G. Wilson
 Indigofera aspalathoides DC.
 Indigofera asterocalycina Gilli
 Indigofera atrata N.E.Br.
 Indigofera atricephala J.B.Gillett
 Indigofera baileyi F.Muell.
 Indigofera balfouriana Craib
 Indigofera bancroftii Peter G.Wilson
 Indigofera bangweolensis R.E.Fr.
 Indigofera banii N.D.Khoi & Yakovlev
 Indigofera barteri Hutch. & Dalziel
 Indigofera basedowii E.Pritz.
 subsp. basedowii E.Pritz.
 subsp. longibractea (J.Black) Peter G.Wilson
 Indigofera bayensis Thulin
 Indigofera bella Prain
 Indigofera benguellensis Baker
 Indigofera berhautiana J.B.Gillett
 Indigofera bijuga Walp.
 Indigofera blaiseae Du Puy & Labat
 Indigofera bogdanii J.B.Gillett
 Indigofera boinensis R.Vig.
 Indigofera brachynema J.B.Gillett
 Indigofera bracteata Baker
 Indigofera brassii Baker
 Indigofera brevidens Benth.
 var. brevidens Benth.
 var. uncinata Benth.
 Indigofera brevifilamenta J.B.Gillett
 Indigofera breviracemosa Torre
 Indigofera breviviscosa J.B.Gillett
 Indigofera brunoniana Wall.
 Indigofera buchananii Burtt Davy
 Indigofera bungeana Walp.

 Indigofera burttii Baker f.
 Indigofera bussei J.B.Gillett
 Indigofera calcicola Craib
 Indigofera campestris Benth.
 var. angustifolia M.Micheli
 var. campestris Benth.
 var. intermedia Hassler
 Indigofera candicans Aiton
 Indigofera capitata Kotschy
 Indigofera carlesi Craib
 Indigofera caudata Dunn
 Indigofera cecilii N.E.Br.
 Indigofera cedrorum Dunn
 Indigofera chaetodonta Franch.
 Indigofera charlierana Schinz
 var. charlierana Schinz
 var. lata J.B.Gillett
 var. scaberrima (Schinz) J.B.Gillett
 Indigofera chenii S.S.Chien
 Indigofera chevalieri Tisser.
 Indigofera chirensis J.B.Gillett
 Indigofera chuniana F.P.Metcalf
 Indigofera ciferrii Chiov.
 Indigofera cinerascens Franch.
 Indigofera circinella Baker f.
 Indigofera circinnata Harv.
 Indigofera cliffordiana J.B.Gillett
 Indigofera commixta N.E.Br.
 Indigofera comosa N.E.Br.
 Indigofera complanata Spreng.
 Indigofera complicata Eckl. & Zeyh.
 Indigofera concinna Baker
 Indigofera conferta J.B.Gillett
 Indigofera confusa Prain & Baker f.
 Indigofera congolensis De Wild. & T.Durand
 var. bongensis (Baker f.) J.B. Gillett
 var. congolensis De Wild. & T.Durand
 Indigofera constricta (Thwaites) Trimen
 var. constricta (Thwaites) Trimen
 var. deorum McVaugh
 Indigofera corallinosperma Torre
 Indigofera coronillifolia Benth.
 Indigofera costaricensis Benth.

 Indigofera crebra N.E.Br.
 Indigofera crotalarioides (Klotzsch) Baker
 Indigofera cryptantha Harv.
 subsp. cryptantha Harv.
 subsp. desmodioides (Baker) Du Puy & Labat
 Indigofera cuitoensis Baker f.
 Indigofera cuneata Oliv.
 Indigofera cunenensis Torre
 Indigofera curvata J.B.Gillett
 Indigofera curvirostrata Thulin
 Indigofera cylindrica sensu auct.
 Indigofera damarana Merxm. & A.Schreib.
 Indigofera daochengensis Y.Y.Fang & C.Z.Zheng
 Indigofera dasyantha Baker f.
 Indigofera dasycephala Baker f.
 Indigofera dauensis J.B.Gillett
 Indigofera deccanensis Sanjappa
 Indigofera deflersii Baker f.
 Indigofera dekindtii Tisser.
 Indigofera delagoaensis J.B.Gillett
 Indigofera delavayi Franch.
 Indigofera dembianensis (Chiov.) J.B.Gillett
 Indigofera densa N.E.Br.
 Indigofera densiflora M.Martens & Galeotti
 Indigofera densifructa Y.Y.Fang & C.Z.Zheng

 Indigofera desertorum Torre

 Indigofera dichroa Craib
 Indigofera dillwynioides Harv.
 Indigofera discolor Rydb.
 Indigofera dissitiflora Oliv.
 Indigofera dolichochaete Craib
 Indigofera dolichothyrsa Baker f.
 Indigofera dregeana E.Mey.
 Indigofera dumetorum Craib
 Indigofera dyeri Britten

 Indigofera efoliata F.Muell.
 Indigofera egens N.E.Br.
 Indigofera elandsbergensis Phillipson
 Indigofera elliotii (Baker f.) J.B.Gillett
 Indigofera elwakensis J.B.Gillett
 Indigofera emarginata Y.Y.Fang & C.Z.Zheng
 Indigofera emarginelloides J.B.Gillett
 Indigofera emmae De Kort & G.Thijsse
 Indigofera enormis N.E.Br.
 Indigofera erecta Thunb.
 Indigofera eriocarpa E.Mey.
 Indigofera esquirolii H.Lev.
 Indigofera evansiana Burtt Davy
 Indigofera evansii Schltr.
 Indigofera exigua Eckl. & Zeyh.
 Indigofera exilis Grierson & D.G.Long
 Indigofera eylesiana J.B.Gillett
 Indigofera faulknerae J.B.Gillett
 Indigofera filiformis L.f.
 Indigofera filipes Harv.
 Indigofera flavicans Baker
 Indigofera floribunda N.E.Br.
 Indigofera foliosa E.Mey.
 Indigofera forrestii Craib
 Indigofera fortunei Craib
 Indigofera fruticosa Rose
 Indigofera fulcrata Harv.
 Indigofera fulvopilosa Brenan
 Indigofera fuscosetosa Baker
 Indigofera galpinii N.E.Br.
 Indigofera gangetica Sanjappa
 Indigofera garckeana Vatke
 Indigofera geminata Baker

 Indigofera giessii A.Schreib.
 Indigofera glaucifolia Cronquist
 Indigofera gloriosa Cronquist
 Indigofera goetzei Harms

 Indigofera gracilis Spreng.
 Indigofera graniticola J.B.Gillett
 Indigofera griseoides Harms
 Indigofera grisophylla Fourc.
 Indigofera guatemalensis Moc., Sessé & Cerv. ex Backer
 Indigofera guthriei Bolus
 Indigofera hamiltonii Duthie & Prain
 Indigofera hamulosa Schltr.
 Indigofera hancockii Craib
 Indigofera hantamensis Diels
 Indigofera helmsii Peter G.Wilson
 Indigofera hendecaphylla Jacq.—trailing indigo, creeping indigo, spicate indigo
 var. hendecaphylla Jacq.
 var. siamensis (Hosseus) Gagnep.
 Indigofera henryi Craib
 Indigofera heterocarpa Baker
 Indigofera hewittii Baker f.
 Indigofera hinanensis H.T.Tsai & T.F.Yu
 Indigofera hofmanniana Schinz
 Indigofera holstii (Baker f.) Baker f.
 Indigofera holubii N.E.Br.
 Indigofera howellii Craib & W.W.Sm.
 Indigofera huillensis Baker f.
 Indigofera humifusa Eckl. & Zeyh.
 Indigofera humilis Kunth
 Indigofera hundtii Rossberg
 Indigofera hybrida N.E.Br.
 Indigofera hygrobia Malme
 Indigofera imerinensis Du Puy & Labat
 Indigofera incana Thunb.
 Indigofera incompta McVaugh

 Indigofera ingrata N.E.Br.
 Indigofera insularis Chiov.
 Indigofera intermedia Harv.
 Indigofera intricata Boiss.
 Indigofera inyangana N.E.Br.
 Indigofera irodoensis Du Puy & Labat
 Indigofera ischnoclada Harms
 Indigofera itremoensis Du Puy & Labat
 Indigofera jaliscensis Rose
 Indigofera jikongensis Y.Y.Fang & C.Z.Zheng
 Indigofera jindongensis Y.Y.Fang & C.Z.Zheng
 Indigofera karkarensis (Thulin) Schrire
 Indigofera kasinii Boonyam.
 Indigofera kerrii De Kort & G.Thijsse
 Indigofera kerstingii Harms
 Indigofera knoblecheri Kotschy
 Indigofera kongwaensis J.B.Gillett
 Indigofera krookii Zahlbr.
 Indigofera kuntzei Harms
 Indigofera kurtzii Kuntze
 Indigofera lamellata Thulin
 Indigofera lancifolia Rydb.
 Indigofera lasiantha Desv.
 Indigofera latifolia Micheli
 Indigofera latisepala J.B.Gillett
 Indigofera laxiflora Craib
 Indigofera leendertziae N.E.Br.
 Indigofera lenticellata Craib
 Indigofera lepida N.E.Br.
 Indigofera leptoclada Harms
 Indigofera letestui Tisser.
 Indigofera leucotricha E.Pritz.
 Indigofera limosa L.Bolus
 Indigofera lindheimeriana Scheele—Lindheimer's indigo
 Indigofera litoralis Chun & T.Chen
 Indigofera livingstoniana J.B.Gillett

 Indigofera longicauda Thuan
 Indigofera longipedicellata J.B.Gillett
 Indigofera longipedunculata Y.Y.Fang & C.Z.Zheng

 Indigofera longistaminata Schrire
 Indigofera lotononoides Baker f.
 Indigofera lughensis Thulin
 Indigofera luzonensis De Kort & G.Thijsse
 Indigofera lydenburgensis N.E.Br.

 Indigofera macrantha Harms
 Indigofera madagascariensis Vatke
 Indigofera malacostachys Harv.
 Indigofera malindiensis J.B.Gillett
 Indigofera malongensis Cronquist
 Indigofera manyoniensis Baker f.
 Indigofera maritima Baker
 Indigofera masaiensis J.B.Gillett
 Indigofera masonae N.E.Br.
 Indigofera matudae Lundell
 Indigofera maymyoensis Sanjappa
 Indigofera megacephala J.B.Gillett
 Indigofera mekongensis Jessup
 Indigofera mendesii Torre
 Indigofera mendoncae J.B.Gillett
 Indigofera mengtzeana Craib
 Indigofera micheliana Rose
 Indigofera micrantha E.Mey.
 Indigofera micropetala Baker f.
 Indigofera mildrediana Torre
 Indigofera milne-redheadii J.B.Gillett
 Indigofera minbuensis Gage
 Indigofera mischocarpa Schltr.
 Indigofera mollicoma N.E.Br.
 Indigofera monanthoides J.B.Gillett
 Indigofera monbeigii Craib
 Indigofera monophylla DC.
 Indigofera monostachya Eckl. & Zeyh.
 Indigofera montana Rose
 Indigofera mouroundavensis Baill.
 Indigofera muliensis Y.Y.Fang & C.Z.Zheng
 Indigofera mundtiana Eckl. & Zeyh.
 Indigofera mupensis Torre
 subsp. abercornensis J.B.Gillett
 subsp. mupensis Torre
 Indigofera mwanzae J.B.Gillett
 Indigofera myosurus Craib
 Indigofera nairobiensis Baker f.
 subsp. nairobiensis Baker f.
 subsp. viscida J.B.Gillett
 Indigofera nambalensis Harms

 Indigofera neoglabra Wang & T.Tang
 Indigofera neosericopetala P.C. Li
 Indigofera nesophila Lievens & Urbatsch
 Indigofera nigricans Pers.
 Indigofera nivea R.Vig.
 Indigofera nugalensis Thulin
 Indigofera nummulariifolia (L.) Alston
 Indigofera obscura N.E.Br.
 Indigofera ogadensis J.B.Gillett
 Indigofera oligophylla Klotzsch
 Indigofera omariana J.B.Gillett
 Indigofera ormocarpoides Baker
 Indigofera orthocarpa C.Presl
 Indigofera oubanguiensis Tisser.
 Indigofera ovina Harv.
 Indigofera oxalidea Baker
 Indigofera oxytropis Harv.
 Indigofera oxytropoides Schltr.
 Indigofera palmeri S.Watson
 Indigofera pampaniniana Craib
 Indigofera panamensis Rydb.
 Indigofera pappei Fourc.
 Indigofera paracapitata J.B.Gillett
 Indigofera paraglaucifolia Torre
 Indigofera paraoxalidea Torre
 Indigofera parkesii Craib
 Indigofera parodiana Burkart
 Indigofera parviflora F. Heyne ex Hook. & Arn.

 Indigofera patula Baker
 Indigofera pauciflora Eckl. & Zeyh.
 Indigofera paucifolioides Blatt. & Hallb.
 Indigofera paucistrigosa J.B.Gillett

 Indigofera pearsonii Baker f.
 Indigofera pechuelii Kuntze
 Indigofera pedicellata Wight & Arn.
 Indigofera pedunculata Baker
 Indigofera pellucida J.B.Gillett & Thulin
 Indigofera peltata J.B.Gillett
 Indigofera peltieri Du Puy & Labat
 Indigofera penduloides Y.Y.Fang & C.Z.Zheng
 Indigofera perriniana Spreng.
 Indigofera petiolata Cronquist
 Indigofera phyllanthoides Baker
 Indigofera pilgeriana Schltr.
 Indigofera pilosa Poir.—softhairy indigo
 Indigofera pinifolia Baker
 Indigofera placida N.E.Br.
 Indigofera platypoda E.Mey.
 Indigofera pobeguinii J.B.Gillett
 Indigofera polygaloides M.B.Scott
 Indigofera polysphaera Baker
 Indigofera pongolana N.E.Br.
 Indigofera porrigens Colla
 Indigofera prieureana Guill. & Perr.
 Indigofera procumbens L.
 Indigofera prostrata Willd.
 Indigofera pruinosa Baker
 Indigofera pseudoevansii Hilliard & B.L.Burtt

 Indigofera pseudointricata J.B.Gillett
 Indigofera pseudoparvula R.Vig.
 Indigofera pseudoreticulata Grierson & D.G.Long
 Indigofera pseudosubulata Baker f.
 Indigofera pseudotinctoria Matsum.
 Indigofera pueblensis Rydb.
 Indigofera purpusii Brandegee
 Indigofera quinquefolia E.Mey.
 Indigofera radicifera Cronquist
 Indigofera ramosissima J.B.Gillett
 Indigofera ramulosissima Hosok.
 Indigofera rautanenii Baker f.
 Indigofera reducta N.E.Br.
 Indigofera rehmannii Baker f.
 Indigofera remota Baker f.

 Indigofera repens Cronquist
 Indigofera reticulata Franch.
 Indigofera retusa N.E.Br.
 Indigofera rhodantha Fourc.
 Indigofera rhytidocarpa Harv.
 subsp. angolensis J.B.Gillett
 subsp. rhytidocarpa Harv.

 Indigofera rigioclada Craib
 Indigofera ripae N.E.Br.
 Indigofera rojasii Hassl.
 Indigofera rostrata Bolus
 Indigofera ruspolii Baker f.
 Indigofera sabulosa Thulin
 Indigofera salmoniflora Rose
 Indigofera salteri Baker f.
 Indigofera santapaui Sanjappa
 Indigofera santosii Torre
 Indigofera saxicola Benth.
 Indigofera scabrida Dunn
 Indigofera scarciesii Scott-Elliot
 Indigofera schinzii N.E.Br.
 Indigofera schliebenii Harms
 Indigofera schultziana F.Muell.
 Indigofera scopiformis Thulin
 Indigofera sebungweensis J.B.Gillett
 Indigofera secundiflora Poir.
 Indigofera senegalensis Lam.
 Indigofera sensitiva Franch.
 Indigofera sericovexilla C.T.White
 Indigofera sesquipedalis Sanjappa
 Indigofera sessilifolia DC.
 Indigofera setosa N.E.Br.
 Indigofera sieberiana Scheele
 Indigofera silvestrii Pamp.
 var. alii Sanjappa
 var. silvestrii Pamp.
 Indigofera simaoensis Y.Y.Fang & C.Z.Zheng
 Indigofera sisalis J.B.Gillett
 Indigofera smutsii J.B.Gillett
 Indigofera sordida Harv.
 Indigofera souliei Craib
 Indigofera sparsa Baker
 Indigofera sparteola Chiov.
 Indigofera sphaerocarpa A.Gray—Sonoran indigo
 Indigofera sphinctosperma Standl.
 Indigofera splendens Ficalho & Hiern
 Indigofera stachyodes Lindl.
 Indigofera stenosepala Baker
 Indigofera sticta Craib
 Indigofera stricta L.f.
 Indigofera strigulosa Baker f.
 Indigofera suarezensis Du Puy & Labat
 Indigofera subargentea De Wild.
 Indigofera subsecunda Gagnep.
 Indigofera subulifera Baker
 Indigofera subverticellata Gagnep.
 Indigofera szechuensis Craib
 Indigofera taborensis J.B.Gillett
 Indigofera tanaensis J.B.Gillett
 Indigofera taruffiana Torre
 Indigofera taylori J.B.Gillett
 Indigofera teixeirae Torre
 Indigofera tengyuehensis H.T.Tsai & T.F.Yu
 Indigofera tenuifolia Lam.
 Indigofera tenuipes Polhill
 Indigofera tenuis Milne-Redh.
 subsp. major J.B.Gillett
 subsp. tenuis Milne-Redh.
 Indigofera tenuissima E.Mey.
 Indigofera terminalis Baker
 Indigofera tetraptera Taub.
 Indigofera texana Buckley
 Indigofera thesioides Jarvie & C.H.Stirt.

 Indigofera thikaensis J.B.Gillett
 Indigofera thothathri Sanjappa
 Indigofera thymoides Baker
 Indigofera tirunelvelica Sanjappa
 Indigofera tomentosa Eckl. & Zeyh.
 Indigofera torrei J.B.Gillett
 Indigofera transvaalensis Baker f.
 Indigofera trialata A.Chev.
 Indigofera trichopoda Guill. & Perr.
 Indigofera trifolioides Baker f.
 Indigofera triquetra E.Mey.
 Indigofera tristoides N.E.Br.
 Indigofera tryonii Domin
 Indigofera tumidula Rose
 Indigofera ufipaensis J.B.Gillett
 Indigofera ugandensis Baker f.
 Indigofera vanderystii J.B.Gillett
 Indigofera velutina E.Mey.
 Indigofera venusta Eckl. & Zeyh.

 Indigofera viscidissima Baker
 subsp. orientalis J.B.Gillett
 subsp. viscidissima Baker
 Indigofera vivax Schrank

 Indigofera wildiana J.B.Gillett
 Indigofera williamsonii (Harv.) N.E.Br.
 Indigofera wilsonii Craib
 Indigofera woodii Bolus
 Indigofera zanzibarica J.B.Gillett
 Indigofera zavattarii Chiov.
 Indigofera zenkeri Baker f.
 Indigofera zornioides Du Puy & Labat

Species names with uncertain taxonomic status
The status of the following species is unresolved:

 Indigofera abyssinica Hochst. ex Baker
 Indigofera adaochengensis Y.Y. Fang & C.Z. Zheng
 Indigofera adenophylla Graham
 Indigofera adenotricha Peter G.Wilson
 Indigofera adesmiaefolia A. Gray
 Indigofera adonensis E.Mey.
 Indigofera aeruginis Schweinf.
 Indigofera agowensis Hochst. ex Baker
 Indigofera alata Schweinf.
 Indigofera alba Gouault
 Indigofera amaliae Domin
 Indigofera angulata Lindl.
 Indigofera angulata Rottler ex Spreng.
 Indigofera aphylla Breiter
 Indigofera arborescens Zuccagni

 Indigofera arghawan Royle
 Indigofera argyrea Chiov.
 Indigofera armata Wall.
 Indigofera ascendens Walp.
 Indigofera astragaloides Welw. ex Romariz
 Indigofera athrophylla Eckl. & Zeyh.
 Indigofera axillaris E.Mey.
 Indigofera bagshawei Baker f.
 Indigofera baoulensis A.Chev.
 Indigofera barbata Desv.
 Indigofera barcensis Chiov.
 Indigofera bequaerti De Wild.
 Indigofera berteroana Spreng.
 Indigofera bertolonii Steud.
 Indigofera biflora Roth
 Indigofera bilabiata Loisel. ex Drapiez
 Indigofera boylei Hort. ex Vilmorin's
 Indigofera brachycarpa Graham
 Indigofera brachyodon Domin
 Indigofera brachyphylla Al-Turki
 Indigofera brachypoda Steud. ex A.Rich.
 Indigofera brevipes (S. Watson) Rydb.
 Indigofera bufalina Lour.
 Indigofera caesia Zipp. ex Span.
 Indigofera caespitosa Wight
 Indigofera calva E.Mey.
 Indigofera carlesii Craib
 Indigofera ceciliae N.E.Br.

 Indigofera celebica Miq.
 Indigofera centrota Eckl. & Zeyh.
 Indigofera chitralensis Sanjappa
 Indigofera cinericolor F.Muell.
 Indigofera clitorioides G.Don
 Indigofera colorata Roxb. ex Wight & Arn.
 Indigofera coluteifolia Jaub. & Spach
 Indigofera condensata De Wild.
 Indigofera conradsii Baker f.
 Indigofera constricta Rydb.
 Indigofera cornezuelo Moc. & Sessé ex DC.
 Indigofera cornuligera Peter G.Wilson & Rowe
 Indigofera coronillaefolia A. Cunn. ex Benth.
 Indigofera coronillaefolia hort.
 Indigofera crassisiliqua Steud.
 Indigofera dalzelliana (Kuntze) Peter G.Wilson
 Indigofera dalzielii Hutch.
 Indigofera debilis Graham
 Indigofera decumbens Hill
 Indigofera deginensis Sanjappa
 Indigofera dequinensis Sanjappa
 Indigofera dewevrei Micheli
 Indigofera diffusa Desv.
 Indigofera dimorphophylla Schinz
 Indigofera disjuncta J. B. Gillett
 Indigofera dodecaphylla Ficalho & Hiern
 Indigofera dorycnium Fenzl
 Indigofera dosycnium Fenzl
 Indigofera dubia Steud.
 Indigofera dumosa E.Mey.
 Indigofera elachantha Peter G.Wilson & Rowe
 Indigofera elatior Carrière
 Indigofera elegans Schumach. & Thonn.
 Indigofera ellenbeckii Baker f.
 Indigofera elskensii Baker f.
 Indigofera enonensis E.Mey.
 Indigofera erectifructa Y.Endo, H.Ohashi & Madulid
 Indigofera erythrantha Hochst. ex Baker
 Indigofera erythrogrammoides De Wild.
 Indigofera esquirolii H. Lév.
 Indigofera faberi Craib
 Indigofera flavovirens R.E.Fr.
 Indigofera flexuosa Eckl. & Zeyh.
 Indigofera flexuosa Graham
 Indigofera florida E.Mey.
 Indigofera foliolosa Graham
 Indigofera formosana Matsum.
 Indigofera franchetii X.F.Gao & Schrire
 Indigofera frumentacea Roxb. ex Wight & Arn.
 Indigofera fruticulosa Walp.
 Indigofera fuzi Sieb. ex Miq.
 Indigofera gilletii De Wild. & T.Durand
 Indigofera glauca Lam.
 Indigofera glauca Perr. ex DC.
 Indigofera grahamiana Steud.
 Indigofera grandifoliola Carrière
 Indigofera graveolens Schrad.
 Indigofera griquana Schltr. ex Zahlbr.
 Indigofera guineensis Schumach. & Thonn.
 Indigofera haematica Peter G.Wilson
 Indigofera hainanensis H.T.Tsai & T.T.Yü
 Indigofera heptaphylla Hiern
 Indigofera hislopii Baker f.
 Indigofera hockii De Wild. & Baker f.
 Indigofera hookeriana Meisn.
 Indigofera hover Forssk.
 Indigofera inconspicua Domin
 Indigofera iwafusi Sieb. ex Lavallee
 Indigofera jaubertiana Schweinf.
 Indigofera jirahulia Buch.-Ham.
 Indigofera juncea Decne.
 Indigofera karongensis Baker
 Indigofera kerensis Chiov.
 Indigofera kisantuensis De Wild. & T.Durand
 Indigofera kotoensis Hayata
 Indigofera latibracteata Harms
 Indigofera latipinna I.M.Johnst.
 Indigofera laxeracemosa Baker f.
 Indigofera leptocaulis Eckl. & Zeyh.
 Indigofera leptophylla E.Mey.
 Indigofera lignosa De Wild.
 Indigofera limifolia Benth.
 Indigofera lindleyana Spreng. ex Steud.
 Indigofera linearis DC.
 Indigofera linearis Guill. & Perr.
 Indigofera litoralis Chun & T.C. Chen
 Indigofera liukiuennsis Makino & Nemoto
 Indigofera lonchocarpifolia Baker
 Indigofera longebarbata Engl.
 Indigofera longepedicellata J. B. Gillett
 Indigofera longeracemosa Boivin ex Baill.
 Indigofera longibractea J.M.Black
 Indigofera lupulina Baker
 Indigofera machaerocarpa Fenzl ex Baker
 Indigofera macroptera hort. ex Lavallée
 Indigofera macrostachys Vent.
 Indigofera mangokyensis R. Vig.
 Indigofera marginata Walp.
 Indigofera masukuensis Baker
 Indigofera mckinlayi F.Muell.
 Indigofera mearnsi Standl.
 Indigofera megaphylla X.F.Gao
 Indigofera melanotricha Steud. ex A.Rich.
 Indigofera melolobioides Benth. ex Harv.
 Indigofera microphylla Lam.
 Indigofera microstachya C.Presl
 Indigofera minutiflora Hochst. ex Chiov.
 Indigofera minutiflora Walp.
 Indigofera moeroensis De Wild.
 Indigofera multijuga Baker
 Indigofera mutisii (Kunth) Spreng.
 Indigofera nematopoda Baker f.
 Indigofera neoarborea Hu ex F.T. Wang & Tang
 Indigofera noldeae Rossbach
 Indigofera nuda G.Don
 Indigofera nyikensis Baker
 Indigofera oligantha Harms ex Baker f.
 Indigofera oligosperma DC.
 Indigofera orixensis Roxb. ex Wight & Arn.
 Indigofera oroboides E.Mey.
 Indigofera oxyrachis Peter G.Wilson
 Indigofera paludosa Lepr. ex Guill. & Perr.
 Indigofera palustris Vatke
 Indigofera perrottetii DC.
 Indigofera petraea Peter G.Wilson & Rowe
 Indigofera pilifera Peter G.Wilson & Rowe
 Indigofera platyspira J.B.Gillett ex Thulin & M.G.Gilbert
 Indigofera plumosa Spreng.
 Indigofera polyclada Peter G.Wilson & Rowe
 Indigofera polysperma De Wild. & T.Durand
 Indigofera pratensis var. coriacea Domin
 Indigofera preladoi Harms
 Indigofera pretoriana Harms
 Indigofera procumbens Torre
 Indigofera propinqua Hochst. ex Chiov.
 Indigofera psammophila Peter G.Wilson
 Indigofera pseudoheterantha X.F.Gao & Schrire
 Indigofera pseudomoniliformis Schrire
 Indigofera purpurea Page ex Steud.
 Indigofera quadrangularis Graham
 Indigofera racemosa L.
 Indigofera rarifolia Steud.
 Indigofera rechodes Eckl. & Zeyh.
 Indigofera reflexa E.Mey.
 Indigofera rhechodes Walp.
 Indigofera rhodosantha Zipp. ex Miq.
 Indigofera rigescens E.Mey.
 Indigofera roylei Koehne
 Indigofera roylii Hort. ex Dippel
 Indigofera rubromarginata Thulin
 Indigofera rumphiensis Schrire
 Indigofera rupestris Eckl. & Zeyh.
 Indigofera rupicola Peter G.Wilson & Rowe
 Indigofera sabulicola Benth.
 Indigofera saltiana Steud.
 Indigofera sangana Harms, in Schltr.
 Indigofera scabrella Kazandj. & Peter G.Wilson
 Indigofera schimperiana Hochst.
 Indigofera scoparia Vahl ex DC.
 Indigofera secunda E.Mey.
 Indigofera sericea Benth. ex Baker
 Indigofera sericea L.
 Indigofera sericea Thunb. ex Harv.
 Indigofera sericophylla Franch.
 Indigofera setacea E.Mey.
 Indigofera shipingensis X.F.Gao
 Indigofera shirensis Taub. ex Baker f.
 Indigofera signata Domin
 Indigofera similis N.E.Br.
 Indigofera sinuspersica Mozaff.
 Indigofera socotrana Vierh.
 Indigofera sofa Scott-Elliot
 Indigofera solirimae Schrire
 Indigofera somalensis Vatke
 Indigofera sousae M.A.Exell
 Indigofera sparsiflora Hochst. ex Baker
 Indigofera speciosa Fraser ex Hook.
 Indigofera spirocarpa Harms
 Indigofera spoliata Hoffmanns.
 Indigofera subincana N.E.Br.
 Indigofera subquadriflora Hochst. ex Chiov.
 Indigofera subtilis E.Mey.
 Indigofera sylvatica Sieber ex Spreng.
 Indigofera sylvestris Pamp.
 Indigofera taiwaniana T.C.Huang & M.J.Wu
 Indigofera tenella Schumach. & Thonn.
 Indigofera tenella Vahl ex DC.
 Indigofera tenuicaulis Klotzsch
 Indigofera tenuisiliqua Schweinf.
 Indigofera ternata Roxb. ex Wight & Arn.
 Indigofera thirionni H.Lév.
 Indigofera thonningii Schumach. & Thonn.
 Indigofera tinctaria Hook.
 Indigofera triflora Peter G.Wilson & Rowe
 Indigofera trita var. nubica (J.B.Gillett) L.Boulos & Schrire
 Indigofera tritoidea Baker
 Indigofera ultima (Kuntze) Peter G.Wilson
 Indigofera unifoliata Merr.
 Indigofera urostachya Fenzl ex Baker
 Indigofera viguieri Callm. & Labat
 Indigofera villosa Berg. ex Walp.
 Indigofera wannanii Peter G.Wilson
 Indigofera wentzeliana Harms
 Indigofera wynbergensis S.Moore
 Indigofera zig-zag De Wild.

Ecology
Indigofera species are used as food plants by the larvae of some Lepidoptera species, including the turnip moth (Agrotis segetum).

See also
Baptisia (false indigo)—a related genus.

References

Further reading

External links

 Indigofera. eFloras Lists.
 

 
Fabaceae genera
Plant dyes
Pantropical flora